Patricia Ancira (born Patricia Ancira Berny in Mexico City, D.F., Mexico) is a Mexican actress.

Early life
Ancira was born in Mexico City, D.F., Mexico. 

In 1978 she played in the telenovela Un original y veinte copias. Later played in the telenovelas Rosalía, Colorina, Vanessa, Rosa Salvaje and Sortilegio.

Filmography

External links

Living people
Mexican telenovela actresses
Mexican television actresses
Mexican film actresses
Actresses from Mexico City
20th-century Mexican actresses
21st-century Mexican actresses
Mexican people of English descent
Year of birth missing (living people)